Operophtera is a genus of moths in the family Geometridae erected by Jacob Hübner in 1825.

Selected species
 Operophtera bruceata (Hulst, 1886) – bruce spanworm (also native winter moth in North America)
 Operophtera brumata (Linnaeus, 1758) – winter moth
 Operophtera danbyi (Hulst, 1896)
 Operophtera fagata (Scharfenberg, 1805) – northern winter moth

References

External links
 

 
Operophterini
Taxa named by Jacob Hübner